Silchar- Coimbatore Superfast Express is an Express train of the Indian Railways belonging to Northeast Frontier Railway connecting  in Assam and   in Tamil Nadu. It is currently being operated with 12516/12515 train numbers on once in week basis.
The train passes through Assam, West Bengal, Bihar, Jharkhand,  Odisha, Andhra Pradesh and Tamil Nadu.
During its journey the train travels through major cities like Guwahati, Siliguri, Malda, Kolkata, Kharagpur, Cuttack, Bhubaneswar, Vizianagaram,  Visakhapatnam, Rajahmundry, Vijayawada, Chennai, Vellore, Salem, Erode and Coimbatore. It holds the record of 7th Longest running train of Indian Railways that covers 3492 km. (as of 2022).

Routing

The 12515 / 16  Silchar–Coimbatore Superfast Express runs through the following states and railway stations:

ASSAM
   (Starts) 
 
 New Haflong
 
 Hojai
 
 
 
 
 
 Kokrajhar

BIHAR
 Kishanganj

WEST BENGAL
 New Alipurduar
 New Cooch Behar
 Dhupguri
 New Jalpaiguri (Siliguri)
 Malda Town
 
 Rampurhat
 Bolpur Shantiniketan
 Dankuni (Kolkata)
 

ORISSA
 Balasore
 Bhadrak
 Jajpur Keonjhar
 
 
 
 Balugaon
 Brahmapur

ANDHRA PRADESH
 Palasa
 Srikakulam
 
 
 Rajahmundry
 

TAMIL NADU
  (Chennai)
 
 
 
 
 
 Tirupur
 (Ends)

Note: 
Bold letters indicates Major Railway Stations/Major Cities.
The train also passes through Sahibganj district and Pakur district of Jharkhand, but it does not have any stoppages there.

Reversal
The train reverses the direction in the following stations

Locomotive
From  to  the train is hauled by WAP-4 Locomotive of Electric Loco Shed, Howrah. From  to  the train is hauled by WAP-4 Locomotive of Electric Loco Shed, Arakkonam/ Electric Loco Shed, Erode and vice versa.

Coach Composition
Silchar Coimbatore Express consists of One Second AC (2AC) coaches, Four Third AC (3AC) coaches, Thirteen Sleeper (SL) coaches, Two Second Sitting(2S) coaches Engine and One End On Generator (EOG) coach.

Rake Sharing
The train shares its rake with Silchar - Thiruvananthapuram Aronai Superfast Express and Silchar - New Tinsukia Barak Brahmaputra Express.

Gallery

References

Express trains in India
Rail transport in Assam
Rail transport in West Bengal
Rail transport in Bihar
Rail transport in Jharkhand
Rail transport in Odisha
Rail transport in Andhra Pradesh
Rail transport in Tamil Nadu
Transport in Guwahati